Depression and Anxiety is a monthly peer-reviewed medical journal published by Wiley-Blackwell. It is an official journal of the Anxiety and Depression Association of America and covers research on depressive and anxiety disorders. The editor-in-chief as of July 1, 2017 is Murray B. Stein (University of California, San Diego). The journal was established in 1993 as two separate journals: Depression and Anxiety, which were merged in 1996 under the current title.

Abstracting and indexing 
The journal is abstracted and indexed in:

According to the Journal Citation Reports, the journal has a 2015 impact factor of 5.004.

References

External links 
 

Publications established in 1993
Monthly journals
Wiley-Blackwell academic journals
Psychiatry journals
Clinical psychology journals
English-language journals